Laurel is a historic passenger rail station on the MARC Camden Line in Laurel, Maryland, between the District of Columbia's Washington Union Station and Baltimore's Camden Station.

Station
The Laurel railroad station was originally constructed in 1884 for the Baltimore and Ohio Railroad along the railroad's Washington Branch, about halfway between Baltimore and Washington, DC.  The architect was E. Francis Baldwin.  The structure is constructed of brick, and is one and a half stories, modified rectangle in form with overhanging gabled and hipped roof sections with brackets and terra cotta cresting, and an interior chimney.  There is a louvered lunette in one gable, stick work in another, and fish-scale shingling under truncated hipped section; shed shelter, segmental arched openings. It is Queen Anne in style. It is nearly identical in plan and dimensions to the Gaithersburg, Maryland station Baldwin designed, also built in 1884, although the rooflines and settings are quite different.

Laurel station was listed on the National Register of Historic Places in 1973, (although one source claims it was 1972) and was reopened as a MARC station when the Camden Line was established.

A fire gutted the interior of the station, and damaged its roof and brick walls, in January 1992.

In February 2009, Vice President Joe Biden, Governor Martin O'Malley, and Senator Ben Cardin gave a speech at Laurel station to gain support for an economic stimulus package in Congress that would provide funding to rebuild the station platform, among many other Maryland infrastructure projects. The funding bill passed and by mid-March, construction fencing went up for an anticipated six months of work on a new platform and other station improvement.

Station layout
The station has two side platforms and a station house adjacent to the southbound platform. The station is compliant with the Americans with Disabilities Act of 1990.

Gallery

References

External links

, including photo in 1975, at Maryland Historical Trust website

 Main Street entrance from Google Maps Street View

1884 establishments in Maryland
Camden Line
MARC Train stations
Buildings and structures in Laurel, Maryland
Former Baltimore and Ohio Railroad stations
Railway stations on the National Register of Historic Places in Maryland
Railway stations in the United States opened in 1884
Railway stations in Prince George's County, Maryland
Historic American Buildings Survey in Maryland
Queen Anne architecture in Maryland
National Register of Historic Places in Prince George's County, Maryland